Radek Pilař ( 23 April 1931 Písek - 7 February 1993) was a Czech artist active in illustrations, animation, graphics, painting, filmmaking, and film directing . He graduated from the Academy of Fine Arts, Prague with Professor . He is best known as the author of the images of popular fictional character of the gallant robber Rumcajs.

He is recognized as the founder of Czech video art.

Pilař had more than 40 solo exhibitions, illustrated 50 books for children published worldwide, created around 40 short films and bedtime stories for the children's TV show Večerníček.

Awards and recognition
He received a number of awards, including:
Hans Christian Andersen Award
Silver Dancer Award for Best Animated Film at the Huesca Short Film Festival, Spain 

In 1990 he was elected Honorary Citizen of Jičín, the city associated wth Rumcajs.

References

1931 births
1993 deaths
Czech artists
Czech illustrators
Czech cartoonists
Burials at Vyšehrad Cemetery
People from Písek